Syzygium papyraceum, known as the paperbark satinash, is a rainforest tree of tropical Queensland, Australia. It can grow to 20 metres tall, the bark is papery, reddish fawn in colour. Leaves are thick and heavy, around 7 cm long. Attractive pink or purple flowers are followed by similarly coloured large edible fruit. Germination is erratic. However, roots and shoots can appear within six weeks. Cuttings strike well.

References

 http://asgap.org.au/s-pap.html

papyraceum
Myrtales of Australia
Flora of Queensland
Ornamental trees
Trees of Australia
Taxa named by Bernard Hyland